The Iberoamerican University Torreón (Universidad Iberoamericana Torreón) is a private university located in the city of Torreón. It belongs to the Jesuit University System (SUJ) and the Association of Universities Entrusted to the Society of Jesus in Latin America. The Iberoamerican University Torreón was founded in 1982 and has a student population of 1732 students. It offers 16 bachelor's degrees (licenciaturas), 7 master's degrees and one doctorate. Located at Torreón, Coahuila, it has extension centres in the cities of Saltillo and Monterrey.

History 
The Society of Jesus opened Iberoamerican University in Mexico City in 1943 and extended its efforts to Torreón in 1982. The first classes included 129 students in Communication, Civil Engineering, Industrial Relations, and Theology. In 1984 construction began on the present campus. Buildings were completed between 1986 and 1993. In 1992 the Federation of Colleges of Architects of Mexico made honorable mention for the attractive but functional style of the buildings. The current 20.3 hectare campus includes six buildings which occupy about 2.5 hectares.

Academic programs

Undergraduate

Master's Degree 

 Directors and Senior Management
 Quality
 Education and Teaching Processes
 Human development
 Family therapy
 Project management
 Strategic Design and Innovation

Specialties
 Bioneuroemocion
 Agroindustrial innovation
 Amparo proceeding
 Metallurgy and Materials

Doctorate
Social Process Research

See also
 Iberoamericana University, Mexico City
 Universidad Iberoamericana León
 Universidad Iberoamericana Puebla
 Western Institute of Technology and Higher Education
 Loyola University of the Pacific
 Carlos Pereyra School
 List of Jesuit sites

References

Jesuit universities and colleges in Mexico
Educational institutions established in 1982